Geer is a municipality of Wallonia located in the province of Liège, Belgium. 

On January 1, 2006, Geer had a total population of 2,854. The total area is 23.62 km² which gives a population density of 121 inhabitants per km². Geer lies along the upper course of the river Jeker, which is called Geer in French.

The municipality consists of the following districts: Boëlhe, Darion, Geer, Hollogne-sur-Geer, Lens-Saint-Servais, Ligney, and Omal.

See also
 List of protected heritage sites in Geer

References

External links
 

Municipalities of Liège Province